Pierre Baehr (born 14 May 1954) is a French former backstroke swimmer. He competed in two events at the 1972 Summer Olympics.

References

External links
 

1954 births
Living people
French male backstroke swimmers
Olympic swimmers of France
Swimmers at the 1972 Summer Olympics
Place of birth missing (living people)